Shorea patoiensis is a tree in the family Dipterocarpaceae, native to Borneo. The specific epithet patoiensis refers to Bukit Patoi, a hill in Brunei.

Description
The brown bark is flaky. The inflorescences bear yellow flowers.

Distribution and habitat
Shorea patoiensis is endemic to Borneo.

Conservation
Shorea patoiensis has been assessed as near threatened on the IUCN Red List. It is threatened by conversion of land for intensive agriculture. It is also threatened by logging for its timber and by the construction of logging roads. Mining occurs in the species' habitat in Kalimantan. Shorea patoiensis does occur in a number of protected areas.

References

patoiensis
Endemic flora of Borneo
Plants described in 1962